Jessica Backhaus (born 1970) is a German photographer.

Early life
Backhaus was born in 1970 Cuxhaven, Germany. In 1986 she moved to Paris. In 1992, at the age of 22, she met the French photographer Gisele Freund, who became a friend and influential mentor.

Career
Her work is held in the collections of the Museum of Fine Arts Houston and the Yale University Art Gallery.

Photo books
Jesus and the Cherries (2005)
What Still Remains (2008)
One Day in November (2008)
I Wanted to See the World (2011)

References

Living people
1970 births
20th-century German photographers
21st-century German photographers
20th-century German women artists
21st-century German women artists